The Douglas Flat School is a historic school building on California State Route 4 in Douglas Flat, California. The school was built in 1854 to serve miners who settled in Douglas Flat during the California Gold Rush; the school site was the only place in Douglas Flat where mining was not permitted, as the mining rights on the property were reserved for the first teachers. The building was designed in a vernacular Greek Revival style, a popular style during the Gold Rush. The simple design of the school includes a pedimented gable in the front, an architrave set atop plain pilasters, a flat cornice, and a small belfry. The one-room schoolhouse first taught classes in 1856 and operated until 1956. It reopened in 1971 to become a kindergarten and later became a community center.

The Douglas Flat School was added to the National Register of Historic Places on May 24, 1973.

References

External links

School buildings on the National Register of Historic Places in California
Greek Revival architecture in California
Buildings and structures in Calaveras County, California
Schools in Calaveras County, California
One-room schoolhouses in California
National Register of Historic Places in Calaveras County, California
1854 establishments in California